Robert Neil Innes (born 1959) is a British Anglican bishop. Since 2014, he has been the Bishop in Europe.

Early life and education
Innes was born in Wolverhampton and educated at the Royal Grammar School, Guildford, and studied engineering at Cambridge University, gaining his Bachelor of Arts (BA) degree in 1982. He worked in the electric power industry until 1989 when he went to train for the priesthood at Cranmer Hall, Durham, whence he gained a further BA (in Theology) in 1991 and his doctorate (Doctor of Philosophy, PhD) from Durham University in 1995. His doctoral thesis was titled "Strategies for securing the unity of the self in Augustine and certain modern psychologists".

Ordained ministry

Innes was made a deacon at Petertide (2 July) 1995, by Michael Turnbull, Bishop of Durham, at Durham Cathedral, and ordained a priest the next year. He then became a lecturer in systematic theology at St John's College, Durham (of which Cranmer Hall is a part), while serving two titles/curacies: he was ordained to the title of St Cuthbert's Church, Durham and then served a curacy at Sherburn, Pittington and Shadforth from 1997. He remained in these posts until 1999, when he was appointed as vicar of St Mary Magdalene Church in Belmont.

Europe
He moved to Brussels, taking his first Diocese in Europe post in 2005, as Chancellor and Senior Chaplain (i.e. the priest-in-charge) of Holy Trinity Pro-Cathedral, Brussels; he was additionally appointed a Chaplain to the Queen (an honorary post) in 2012. He was appointed Bishop in Europe in 2014; he was consecrated as a bishop on 20 July 2014 at Canterbury Cathedral by Justin Welby, Archbishop of Canterbury (with co-consecrators Richard Chartres, Bishop of London and Tim Dakin, Bishop of Winchester) and installed at Gibraltar Cathedral on 4 September 2014. As Bishop in Europe, his residence is in Waterloo, Belgium.

Personal life
Innes married in 1985 and has four children.

Styles
The Reverend Doctor Robert Innes (1995–2005)
The Reverend Canon Doctor Robert Innes (2005–2014)
The Right Reverend Doctor Robert Innes (2014–present)

References

1959 births
Living people
21st-century Anglican bishops of Gibraltar
People educated at Royal Grammar School, Guildford
Alumni of King's College, Cambridge
Alumni of Cranmer Hall, Durham